In chess, by far the most common scoring system is 1 point for a win, ½ for a draw, and 0 for a loss. 

A number of different notations are used to denote a player's score in a match or tournament, or their long-term record against a particular opponent. The most common are:

Less common systems
 Occasionally, in a match between two players in which draws do not count, the number of draws may be omitted, or mentioned separately. For instance, the World Chess Championship 1978 was won by Anatoly Karpov by a score of 6 wins to 5, with draws not counting. The match score is usually given as "6−5", or "6−5 with 21 draws".

 Sometimes a Three points for a win system is used: 3 points for a win, 1 for a draw and 0 for a loss. This is usually shown as the number of points from number of games played, for instance "10 points from 6 games" for 3 wins, 2 losses and 1 draw.

References

Chess